Lee Jae-woong may refer to:

 Lee Jae-woong (singer), South Korean singer with Troy
 Lee Jae-woong (sledge hockey) (born 1996), South Korean sledge hockey player